The Prefecture Apostolic of Rhaetia was a Roman Catholic Apostolic Prefecture (missionary pre-diocesan jurisdiction) located in the part of present day Roman Catholic Diocese of Chur in Switzerland.

It was exempt, i.e. directly subject to the Holy See, not part of any ecclesiastical province.

History 
 1621: Established as Apostolic Prefecture of Rhaetia, on territory split off from the Roman Catholic Diocese of Chur.
 1921: Suppressed to Roman Catholic Diocese of Chur after 300 years of existence.

In 1902 the Prefecture Apostolic had 22 parishes, in three of which the majority of inhabitants spoke Italian; 52 churches and chapels; 40 schools for boys and girls; 7200 Catholics and 25 Capuchins.

Ordinaries 
all incumbents were missionary members of the Latin (Roman rite) congregation of the Order of Friars Minor Capuchin (O.F.M.Cap)
 Apostolic Prefects of Rhaetia
 Fr. Ignatius of Cosnigo, O.F.M.Cap. (1621 – 1645)
 Fr. Giovanni Giuseppe Santini, O.F.M.Cap. (Jan 2, 1905 – 1912)

See also 
 Roman Catholicism in Switzerland

Sources and References 
 Profile at Catholic Hierarchy 

Apostolic prefectures
Roman Catholic dioceses and prelatures established in the 17th century
Former Roman Catholic dioceses in Europe